Talon of the Hawk is the second studio album by New Jersey rock band The Front Bottoms, released on May 21, 2013 on Bar/None.

Album title
The album's title is partly inspired by the character, Hawk, from the television series, Twin Peaks. Vocalist and guitarist Brian Sella stated: "I have this thing with pocket knives; I think they’re kind of cool. I was sitting in the van and drew this pocket knife. My girlfriend and I were watching Twin Peaks, and there’s this police officer on the show that’s called Hawk. I thought it was a badass nickname. So on the picture with the pocket knife, I wrote underneath it “Talon Of The Hawk,” just because it popped into my head and thought it was kind of cool. As it was getting close to the time we needed to make a decision on the album name, I found the picture with the pocket knife that I had drawn in the van coming back from recording. I just said the name and everyone kind of just agreed, and that's how it came up."

Special Edition 
On February 22, 2023, a 10 year celebratory special edition vinyl was announced alongside an album specific tour. This edition features the original artwork Sella created as the cover art.

Track listing

Personnel 
The Front Bottoms
 Brian Sella – vocals, guitar
 Mat Uychich – drums
 Tom Warren – bass
 Ciaran O'Donnell – keys, trumpet, guitar

References 

2013 albums
The Front Bottoms albums
Bar/None Records albums